Alfonso Mestre (born 24 September 2001) is a Venezuelan swimmer. He competed in the 2020 Summer Olympics. He swam collegiately at the University of Florida.

References

External links
 Florida Gators bio

2001 births
Living people
Sportspeople from Caracas
Swimmers at the 2020 Summer Olympics
Venezuelan male swimmers
Olympic swimmers of Venezuela
Florida Gators men's swimmers
21st-century Venezuelan people
Competitors at the 2022 South American Games